Beppu (written: 別府) is a Japanese family name. Notable persons with this name include:

, Japanese actress and tarento
Francine Beppu (born 1982), American television personality and entrepreneur
, Japanese professional cyclist
, Japanese samurai
, Japanese cyclist, brother of Fumiyuki Beppu

Fictional Characters
, fictional character from the anime Aikatsu!

Japanese-language surnames